The Charleston riot of 1919 took place on the night of Saturday, May 10, between members of the US Navy and the local black population. They attacked black individuals, businesses, and homes killing six and injuring dozens.

Charleston riot of 1919

The Charleston riot of 1919 started about 10 p.m. on Saturday, May 10, 1919, and ended after midnight.  It began when five white sailors felt they had been cheated by a black man and, unable to find him, attacked African Americans at random. A black man named Isaac Doctor shot at them and was killed. "Within an hour, word of the street brawls and shooting got back to the Charleston Naval Yard and carloads of sailors poured into the black district." 

The fighting started at a pool parlor near Beaufain Street and Charles Street (later renamed as Archdale Street) but eventually spread over much of the commercial section of King Street from Queen Street to Columbus Street. There were more than 1,000 sailors, and some white civilians joined in.  "Two shooting galleries in Beaufain Street were raided by the sailors, the police reported, and the small caliber rifles removed from the galleries and used by the members of the mob."  They attacked black individuals, businesses, and homes. "For a time the rioters practically had possession of the downtown streets. A negro barber shop on King Street was almost wrecked and in several instances street cars were stopped by pulling down the trolley poles and negroes on the cars were beaten up. One negro was shot down as he was snatched off a car."
  
Admiral Frank Edmund Beatty, "who ran the Navy's southern headquarters from the Charleston Navy Yard," ordered Marines sent in, in addition to naval police ("bluejackets"). The Marines, although they were not always well disciplined themselves, worked closely with the city police force from a joint command center. The armed Marines arrived shortly after midnight. By 2:30 a.m., order had been reestablished and the riot was over.

This was the worst violence in Charleston since the Civil War. Five blacks were killed, and another died later. Seventeen black men, seven white sailors, and one police officer suffered serious injuries; 35 blacks and eight sailors were admitted to hospitals. Stores had been ransacked, and black businesses and homes damaged, in some cases extensively.

Restrictions were put by the Navy on men going into Charleston, and naval troops patrolled the streets. Three sailors were court-martialed; one was acquitted and the two others were given a year in a naval prison, followed by dishonorable discharges.

"Forty-nine men, most of them white, were arraigned on charges from murder to rioting to assaulting police officers." Two black and one white man were acquitted of inciting a riot. Charges against the remainder were dropped — police were overwhelmed that night, with little time to spare for taking statements and securing evidence. 8 men received $50 ($ in ) fines for carrying a concealed weapon.

Aftermath

One of Charleston's leading newspapers, The Evening Post, printed an editorial the day after the riots in which blame for the riots was placed squarely on servicemen who were not familiar with Charleston's ways. The piece included the following defense for the city:

This uprising was one of several incidents of civil unrest that began in the so-called American Red Summer, of 1919. The Summer consisted of terrorist attacks on black communities, and white oppression in over three dozen cities and counties. In most cases, white mobs attacked African American neighborhoods. In some cases, black community groups resisted the attacks, especially in Chicago and Washington, D.C. Most deaths occurred in rural areas during events like the Elaine Race Riot in Arkansas, where an estimated 100 to 240 black people and 5 white people were killed. Also occurring in 1919 were the Chicago Race Riot and Washington D.C. race riot which killed 38 and 39 people respectively, and with both having many more non-fatal injuries and extensive property damage reaching up into the millions of dollars.

Bibliography  
Notes

References
 - Total pages: 368
 
 
   

History of Charleston, South Carolina
Riots and civil disorder in South Carolina
1919 in South Carolina
White American riots in the United States
Red Summer
Racially motivated violence against African Americans
May 1919 events
African-American history in Charleston, South Carolina
1919 riots in the United States
20th-century in Charleston, South Carolina
History of racism in South Carolina